The Monastery of Saint John the Theologian (also called Monastery of Saint John the Divine) is a Greek Orthodox monastery founded in 1088 in Chora on the island of Patmos. It is named after St. John of Patmos, the author of the Christian Book of Revelation who, according to the text, lived on the island when visions of the apocalypse came to him. Since its founding, the monastery has been a pilgrimage site and a place of Greek Orthodox learning and worship. The monastery is unique in that it integrated from its founding the surrounding community of Chora, which was built around its fortifications. Religious ceremonies that date back to the early Christian period are still practiced within the monastery today. Because of its sacred significance, uninterrupted architectural evolution, and the exceptional preservation of early Christian customs, the monastery was declared a UNESCO World Heritage Site in 1999, along with the town of Chora and the nearby Cave of the Apocalypse.

History
In 1088, Byzantine Emperor Alexios I Komnenos gave the island of Patmos to the soldier-priest John Christodoulos. The greater part of the monastery was completed by Christodoulos three years later. He heavily fortified the exterior because of the threats of piracy and Seljuk Turks. The oldest parts of the monastery are the Katholikón (main church) and the refectory, dating from the 11th century. The Katholikón has the typical shape of a Byzantine church, with a domed cross-in-square style. The floor is elaborately carved out of marble is opus sectile style, and has wall paintings and frescoes dating to the Middle Ages. A two-storied arcade on the south side of the monastery was built in 1698.

At least 330 manuscripts are housed in the library (267 on parchment), including 82 manuscripts of the New Testament. Minuscules: 1160–1181, 1385–1389, 1899, 1901, 1966, 2001–2002, 2080–2081, 2297, 2464–2468, 2639, 2758, 2504, 2639, and lectionaries.

As of 2012, 40 monks reside at the monastery.
The monastery has, amongst its relics, the skull of Saint Thomas the Apostle.

Gallery

See also 
 Cave of the Apocalypse
 Codex Petropolitanus Purpureus
 Minuscule 2464
 Uncial 0150
 Uncial 0151

Footnotes

External links
Virtual tour of the Monastery of Saint John the Theologian provided by Google Arts & Culture

Byzantine sacred architecture
Saint John the Theologian
Saint John the Theologian
World Heritage Sites in Greece
Christian mysticism
Christian monasteries established in the 11th century
Patmos
Buildings and structures in the South Aegean
Byzantine architecture in Greece
Byzantine monasteries in Greece